Hinduism is the largest religion in India. According to the 2011 Census of India, 966.3 million people identify as Hindu, representing 79.8% of the country's population. India contains 94% of the global Hindu population. The Indian subcontinent is the birthplace of four of the world's major religions: namely Hinduism, Buddhism, Jainism, and Sikhism—collectively known as Indian religions that believe Moksha is the most supreme state of the Ātman (soul).  The vast majority of Indian Hindus belong to Shaivite and Vaishnavite denominations. India is one of the three countries in the world (Nepal and Mauritius being the other two) where Hinduism is the dominant religion.

History of Hinduism
After this period, the Vedic religion merged with local traditions and the renouncer traditions, resulting in the emergence of Hinduism, which has had a profound impact on India's history, culture and philosophy. The name India itself is derived from Sanskrit Sindhu, the historic local appellation for the Indus River. 

The fall of Vijayanagara Empire to Muslim sultans had marked the end of Hindu dominance in the Deccan. Hinduism once again rose to political prestige, under the Maratha Empire.

Partition of India

The 1947 Partition of India gave rise to bloody rioting and indiscriminate inter-communal killing of Hindus, Muslims, and Sikhs across the Indian subcontinent. As a result, an estimated 7.2 million Hindus and Sikhs moved to India and 7.5 million Muslims moved to Pakistan permanently,  leading to demographic change of  both the nations to a certain extent.

Demographics
The Hindu population has increased more than three times from 303,675,084 in 1951 to 966,257,353 in 2011, but the Hindu percentage share of total population has declined from 84.1% in 1951 to 79.8% in 2011. When India achieved independence in 1947, Hindus formed 84% of the total population and pre-Partition British India had 66% of Hindus.

Hindu population by States and Territories

Law and politics 
Although the Constitution of India has declared the nation as a secular state with no state religion, it has been argued several times that the Indian state privileges Hinduism as state sponsored religion constitutionally, legislatively and culturally. The original copy of the Indian constitution has an illustration of Rama, Sita, and Lakshmana in Part III on Fundamental Rights and Rama has been considered as the true guardian of people's rights. Article 343 (1) of the Indian Constitution also states that, "The official language of the Union shall be Hindi in Devanagari script". Also, Article 48 of Indian constitution prohibits the slaughter of cows or calves (a sacred animal in Hinduism) and it is a criminal offense in most of the states of India.

Most Right Wing Hindu organisations like RSS, Bajrang Dal, Vishwa Hindu Parishad have demanded that India should be declared a "Hindu nation" by constitution to safeguard the rights and life of Hindus in this largest democracy. As of 28 July 2020, there were pleas going on Supreme Court of India to remove the words secular and socialist from the Preamble to the Constitution of India.

See also

 Hinduism by country
 Religion in India
 Caste system in India
 Other Backward Class
 Hindus by district in India
 Hinduism in South India
 List of Hindu temples in India
 Freedom of religion in India
 Hindu Marriage Act, 1955
 Hindu Code Bills

References

External links 

 
 

 
India
History of India
History of Hinduism